William Vesey-Fitzgerald may refer to:
William Vesey-FitzGerald, 2nd Baron FitzGerald and Vesey (1783–1843), Irish statesman, MP for Clare, Newport, Lostwithiel, and Ennis
William Vesey-FitzGerald (1818-1885), British politician and MP for Horsham, 1848, 1852–1865, 1874–1875